A hush puppy (or hushpuppy) is a small, savory, deep-fried round ball made from cornmeal-based batter. Hushpuppies are frequently served as a side dish with seafood and other deep-fried foods.

History
The use of ground maize (corn) in cooking originated with Native Americans, who first cultivated the crop. Cherokee, Chickasaw, Choctaw, Creek, and Seminole cooking introduced one of its main staples into Southern cuisine: corn, either ground into meal or limed with an alkaline salt to make hominy, in a Native American technology known as nixtamalization. Cornbread was popular during the American Civil War because it was inexpensive and could be made in many different shapes and sizes. It could be fashioned into high-rising, fluffy loaves or simply fried for a quick meal.To a far greater degree than anyone realizes, several of the most important food dishes that the Southeastern Indians live on today is the "soul food" eaten by both black and white Southerners. ... Indian boiled cornbread is present in Southern cuisine as "corn meal dumplings", ... and as "hush puppies"...

Hushpuppies are strongly associated with the Southern United States. A southern hushpuppy championship is held annually in Lufkin, Texas, and they are also available throughout the United States at restaurants serving deep-fried seafood.

Name
The first recorded use of the word "hush-puppy" dates to 1899. The name has no verified origin. Etymology is attributed to a variety of sources. One claims, with little verification, that it came from hunters, fishermen, or other cooks who would fry some basic cornmeal mixture (possibly that they had been bread-coating or battering their own food with) and feed it to their dogs to "hush the puppies" during cook-outs or fish-fries. Although there are many possible origins for the dish, it is found to be akin to "red-horse bread", named after the red horse fish of the South Carolina rivers. Associated with former slave chef Romeo Govan, "red horse bread" is said to have been similar in consistency and ingredients. "Red horse bread" of South Carolina then became "hushpuppies" in Georgia around 1927, then gained national traction around 1943 in Florida.

Characteristics and preparation
Typical hushpuppy ingredients include cornmeal, wheat flour, eggs, salt, baking soda, milk or buttermilk, and water, and may include onion, spring onion (scallion), garlic, whole kernel corn, and peppers. Sometimes pancake batter is used. The batter is mixed well, adjusting ingredients until thick, and dropped a spoonful at a time into hot oil. Many older recipes call for the batter to be cooked in the same oil as the fish it accompanies. The small breads are fried until crispy golden brown, and cooled. Hushpuppies are often served with seafood or barbecued foods. They are commonly made at home or served in restaurants advertising home-style food.

Caribbean

In Jamaica, such fried bread dumplings are known as "festivals", and are made from a flour and cornmeal dough, with added salt and sugar, which is then formed into hot-dog roll shapes and deep-fried. They are sweeter than hushpuppies, which often contain onion or garlic. They are served with jerked meats such as pork or chicken. Mostly, it is served with fried or escoveitch (see also escabeche and ceviche) fish. 

In Puerto Rico, hushpuppies are made in the shape of a short sausage and are called "sorullos" or "sorullitos". Sugar and parmesan cheese is added to the cornmeal and stuffed with a melting cheese or cream cheese with guava. They are dusted with powdered sugar and served with coffee, guava dipping sauce, or fry sauce.

See also
 
 
 
 
 
 
 
 List of fried dough foods
 List of maize dishes
 List of quick breads
 List of regional dishes of the United States
  – a form of campfire cornbread made during the American Civil War
 
  Indian fried lentil dough snacks, often flatter or disc-shaped

References

American breads
Cuban cuisine
Cuisine of the Southern United States
Jamaican cuisine
Maize dishes
Puerto Rican cuisine
Quick breads
Venezuelan cuisine
Bread dishes